Pristimantis cuneirostris is a species of frog in the family Craugastoridae. It is endemic to Peru where it is only known from its type locality near La Peca, Bagua Province, in the Amazonas Region of northern Peru.
Its natural habitat is tropical moist montane forests.

References

cuneirostris
Amphibians of Peru
Endemic fauna of Peru
Amphibians described in 1999
Taxonomy articles created by Polbot